The 2018 Princess Auto Elite 10 was held from March 15 to 18 at St. James Civic Centre in Winnipeg, Manitoba. It was the fifth Grand Slam of Curling event held in the 2017–18 curling season. The tournament was held between ten men's teams.

Format
Instead of normal curling scoring rules, the Elite 10 uses a match play system in which scoring is based on ends won, rather than rocks scored. An end is won by stealing or scoring two with the hammer, similar to skins curling. Unlike skins, however, there are no carry-overs. In the event of a tie, a draw to the button competition is held to determine the winner. In the standings, wins are worth three points, draw to the button wins are worth two points, and draw to the button losses are worth one point.

Teams
The top 10 teams in the World Curling Tour's year-to-date rankings as of February 5, 2018, were invited to compete in the Elite 10. If any teams declined, the next-highest team was be invited until the field of 10 teams was complete.

Round-robin standings

Round-robin results
All draw times are listed in Central Standard Time (UTC-6).

Draw 1
Thursday, March 15, 12:00 pm

Draw 2
Thursday, March 15, 4:00 pm

Draw 3
Thursday, March 15, 8:00 pm

Draw 4
Friday, March 16, 8:30 am

Draw 5
Friday, March 16, 12:00 pm

Draw 6
Friday, March 16, 4:00 pm

Draw 7
Friday, March 16, 8:00 pm

Tiebreaker
Saturday, March 17, 8:30 am

Playoffs

Quarterfinals
Saturday, March 17, 12:00 pm

SemifinalsSaturday, March 17, 4:00 pmFinal Sunday March 18, 9:30 am''

References

External links

2018 in Canadian curling
Curling competitions in Winnipeg
2018 in Manitoba
March 2018 sports events in Canada